Clarence Bill Huber (October 27, 1895 – February 22, 1965) was a third baseman in Major League Baseball. He played for the Detroit Tigers and Philadelphia Phillies.

References

External links

1895 births
1965 deaths
Major League Baseball third basemen
Detroit Tigers players
Philadelphia Phillies players
Paris Survivors players

Sherman Browns players
Denison Railroaders players
Greenville Spinners players
Toledo Mud Hens players
Memphis Chickasaws players
Beaumont Exporters players
Buffalo Bisons (minor league) players
Chattanooga Lookouts players
Little Rock Travelers players
Dallas Steers players
San Antonio Indians players
Monroe Drillers players
Baseball players from Texas
Sportspeople from Tyler, Texas
Mexia Gassers players